Repun Kamuy is the Ainu kamuy (god) of the sea.

Depiction
Repun Kamuy is sometimes depicted as an orca.  In other instances, he is a carefree, somewhat mischievous young man armed with a harpoon.

Mythology
Repun Kamuy is an important figure in Ainu mythology because the sea represents opportunities for harvests that could not be found on land:  fishing, the hunting of whales, and maritime trading expeditions.  One of his myths displays his carefree nature and his generosity.

In the story, he harpoons a whale and her young, and throws them ashore near a human village.  When he arrives at home, he is visited by a sea wren, who tells him that the humans are cutting up the whales using sickles and axes — that is, not showing proper respect to the animal or to Repun Kamuy as the gift-giver.  Rather than growing angry, he laughs, saying that the meat belongs to the humans and they can do with it as they like.  A short time later, he sets out again, and he happens to pass the same village, where he finds that the sea wren has lied:  the humans are dressed in ritual robes and cutting the flesh from the whales with sacred swords, in the proper manner.  Moved by this display of piety, Repun Kamuy assures the humans that the bounty of the sea will keep them from famine.

Other
Respecting orcas as deities, Ainu tribes held traditional funerals for stranded or deceased orcas (such as on Rebun Island) akin to funerals for other animals such as brown bears.

See also
Animal worship
List of water deities

Notes

References
Ashkenazy, Michael. Handbook of Japanese Mythology. Santa Barbara, California: ABC-Clio, 2003.
Etter, Carl. Ainu Folklore: Traditions and Culture of the Vanishing Aborigines of Japan. Chicago: Wilcox and Follett, 1949.
Munro, Neil Gordon. Ainu Creed and Cult. New York: Columbia University Press, 1995.

Ainu kamuy
Sea and river gods
Animal gods